Otto Forster (born 8 July 1937 in Munich) is a German mathematician.

Education and career
Forster received his Diplom in 1960 from Ludwig Maximilian University of Munich. There he received in 1961 his doctorate. His thesis Banachalgebren stetiger Funktionen auf kompakten Rumen (Banach algebras of continuous functions on compact spaces) was supervised by Karl Stein. In 1965 Forster also completed his habilitation in Munich. After spending the academic year 1966–1967 at the Institute for Advanced Study and the academic year 1967–1968 as a substitute professor at the University of Göttingen, he became a full professor at the University of Regensburg in 1968. In 1968–1969 he was a visiting professor at the University of Geneva. In 1975 he moved to the University of Münster. Since 1982 he has been a professor at the Mathematical Institute of the Ludwig Maximilian University of Munich. Even after his retirement in summer 2005, he still regularly offers lectures for advanced students.

In 1970 he was an invited speaker with talk Topologische Methoden in der Theorie steinscher Räume (Topological methods in the theory of Stein spaces) at the International Congress of Mathematicians in Nice. In 1984 he became a member of the Bavarian Academy of Sciences and Humanities.

Forster's research deals mainly with complex analysis, but also with questions of algebraic geometry, analytic number theory, and algorithmic number theory. His program ARIBAS, an interpreter with a Pascal-like syntax, offers powerful arbitrary-precision arithmetic and various library functions based on such computational arithmetic. ARIBAS, available under the GNU General Public License, also serves as the basis for the algorithms discussed in Forster's book Algorithmische Zahlentheorie (Algorithmic number theory). He wrote two appendices for the 2nd edition of Dale Husemöller's book Elliptic Curves.

Forster became known to a wider audience through his series of textbooks on analysis.

Selected publications

Articles

Books
 with Knut Knorr: 
 Analysis 1. Differential- und Integralrechnung einer Veränderlichen. 12th edition. Springer, 2016, .
 Analysis 2. Differentialrechnung im Rn. Gewöhnliche Differentialgleichungen. 11th edition. Springer, 2017, .
 Analysis 3. Maß- und Integrationstheorie, Integralsätze im Rn und Anwendungen. 8th edition. Springer, 2017, .
 Algorithmische Zahlentheorie, 2nd edition. Springer, 2015, .
Riemannsche Flächen. Springer, 1977; English translation: Lectures on Riemann surfaces. Graduate Texts in Mathematics. Springer, 1991, ; 2012 reprint

References

External links
 
 

1937 births
Living people
20th-century German mathematicians
21st-century German mathematicians
Mathematical analysts
Ludwig Maximilian University of Munich alumni
Academic staff of the University of Regensburg
Academic staff of the University of Münster
Academic staff of the Ludwig Maximilian University of Munich
Members of the Bavarian Academy of Sciences